Aracil is a Spanish surname of Navarran origin.  Notable people with the surname include:

Miguel Aracil (born 1957), Spanish footballer
Alejandro Pérez Aracil (born 1985), Spanish footballer
Miguel Alfonso Pérez Aracil (born 1980), Spanish footballer

References

Spanish-language surnames